The Aesthetic Group Gymnastics World Cup is a competition for aesthetic group gymnastics sanctioned by the International Federation of Aesthetic Group Gymnastics (IFAGG). It is one of the few tournaments in aesthetic group gymnastics officially organized by IFAGG, as well as the World Championships and the European Championships. There are two types, which are organised at the same time – World Cup is for senior teams and Challenge Cup is for junior teams.

Editions

World Cup ranking
There are four partial World Cup and Challenge Cup competitions, where teams can earn ranking points for World Cup and Challenge Cup final ranking. Final ranking is counted from the total sum of three best results (points) of team from four competitions during the season. Ranking point are given to the teams in every World Cup and Challenge Cup after final result (total points) of competition (preliminaries points and finals points). In World Cup and Challenge Cup Final competition points are given 1.5 time normal ranking points.

World Cup Final medalists
Listed below are the teams that scored among top 3 in final World Cup ranking, achieving most points of all.

Senior

Junior

References

External links
 International Federation of Aesthetic Group Gymnastics

 
Aesthetic group gymnastics